The European Youth Forum (from , YFJ) is an international non-profit association that serves as an umbrella organisation and advocacy group of the national youth councils and international non-governmental youth organisations in Europe. It works on youth rights in international institutions such as the European Union, the Council of Europe, and the United Nations.

The European Youth Forum works in the fields of youth policy and youth work development. It focuses its work on European youth policy matters, whilst through engagement on the global level, it is enhancing the capacities of its members and promoting global interdependence. In its daily work, the European Youth Forum represents the views and opinions of youth organisations in all relevant policy areas and promotes the cross-sectoral nature of youth policy towards a variety of institutional actors. The principles of equality and sustainable development are mainstreamed in the work of the European Youth Forum.

It consists of 44 National Youth Councils and 61 international youth NGOs, a total of 105.

History
The European Youth Forum is a European international organization, which was established in 1996 by national youth councils and international non-governmental youth organizations. It works as the successor to the Council of European National Youth Committees (CENYC), Youth Forum of the European Communities (YFEU), and the European Co-ordination Bureau of International Youth Organisations (ECB). CENYC and ECB had been representing youth interests since the sixties. The YFEU was set up by them in the late 1970s to work vis a vis the European Union (then called the European Community). The establishment of a single structure replacing all three was a major rationalization.

Vision, mission, and aims
According to the European Youth Forum their Vision, mission, and aims are as follows:

Vision
To be the voice of young people in Europe, where young people are equal citizens and are encouraged and supported to achieve their fullest potential as global citizens.

Mission
The European Youth Forum is an independent, democratic, youth-led platform, representing national youth councils and international youth organizations from across Europe.

The Youth Forum works to empower young people to participate actively in society to improve their own lives, by representing and advocating their needs and interests and those of their organizations.

Aims
 Increase the participation of young people and youth organizations in society, as well as in decision-making processes;
 Positively influence policy issues affecting young people and youth organizations, by being a recognized partner for international institutions, namely the European Union, the Council of Europe and the United Nations;
 Promote the concept of youth policy as an integrated and cross-sectoral element of overall policy development, namely through youth mainstreaming;
 Facilitate the participation of young people through the development of sustainable and independent youth organizations at the national and international level, particularly in respect to ensuring dependable, adequate funding for them;
 Promote the exchange of ideas and experience, mutual understanding, as well as the equal rights and opportunities among young people in Europe;
 Uphold intercultural understanding, democracy, respect, diversity, human rights, active citizenship, and solidarity;
 Contribute to the development of youth work in other regions of the world.

The European Youth Forum has the task of nominating 20 young people from its member organizations for the Advisory Council on Youth, 13 representatives from international youth organizations (INGYOs) and seven representatives from national youth councils for a two-year mandate. These are elected democratically by the member organizations, usually at the Council of Members (COMEM) in Brussels in spring.

Organisation

Presidents

Current Board
Each board elected by the entire membership every 2 years at the General Assembly, it is made up of:
 President nominated from a National Youth Council (NYC) and/or an International Non-Governmental Youth Organization (INGYO). 
 Vice-president nominated from a National Youth Council (NYC)
 Vice-president nominated from an International Non-Governmental Youth Organization (INGYO)
 4 board members nominated from a National Youth Council (NYC)
 4 board members nominated from an International Non-Governmental Youth Organization (INGYO)
The Secretary-General attends the board meetings as a non-voting ex-officio

Secretaries-General

Funding
In 2012, almost 87% of the Youth Forum income stemmed from annual grants from international institutions. 83.9% of the total income came from the European Communities' Budget, through a grant from DG Education and Culture, while around 3.2% was from Council of Europe grants.

Partnership projects also constitute an essential part of Youth Forum income, and such income includes the support of partner organizations for concrete activities, e.g. YFJ Member Organisations hosting YFJ meetings, or grants from foundations or other entities, such as the United Nations, Governments or Local Authorities.

Volunteer Time Contributions (VTCs) are an essential source of external funding, and which allow the YFJ to fulfill its co-funding requirements as per the European Commission. VTCs also represents the further recognition of volunteer work as an important contribution to society and to the work of youth organizations. These contributions in 2012 represent approximately 4.8% of the Youth Forum budget.

Membership
The European Youth Forum has 104 member organizations of two types of Membership: National Youth Council and International Non-Governmental Youth Organization, of which there are three levels: Observer, Candidate and Full member. Only full members may vote at the statutory meetings of the Forum.

According to the statues: 
 All members have to fulfill the following general criteria:
	to accept and work for the purpose of the Forum;
	to be a non-governmental and not for profit organization;
	to have democratic aims and structures and accept the principles of the European Convention of Human Rights;
	to fully acknowledge the Statutes of the Forum;
	to work with young people and have a decision-making body controlled by young people;
	not to be subject to direction in their decisions by any external authority.

National Youth Councils
Presently there are 43 National Youth Councils who are members of the European Youth Forum. Albania, Bosnia and Herzegovina, Kosovo and Turkey don't currently have recognized National Youth Councils.

National Youth Council members must:
 be the national coordination body of non-governmental youth organizations in a European State;
 be open to all democratic youth organizations at the national level. 
To be full members they must be open to all and represent most of the main democratic youth movements and organizations at the national level in that State.

International Non-Governmental Youth Organisations
Presently there are 61 International Non-Governmental Youth Organisations who are members of the European Youth Forum.

Full IYNGO Members either must have: at least 5000 young members in ten European States, and under no circumstances have less than 300 young members in any one of these ten States; or: have a motivated recommendation from: the Secretary-General and Board; or the Consultative Body on Membership Applications which advises the Board on Membership Applications.

Observer INGYO members must have 3000 young members in at least six European States with at least 100 members in any of these six states.

INGYOs cannot become members if they are largely identical in terms of aims, membership, and structures of an existing INGYO, which is already a member. This is to be appreciated solely by the General Assembly, by a two-thirds majority, abstentions not counted.

References

Archived profile of the European Bureau of Coordination of International Youth Organisations (ECB/BEC), held in the European University Institute - Historical Archives of the European Union, 1994-2006

External links
 European Youth Forum Website
 
 
 European Youth Forum Publications
 Archives of the European Youth Forum at the Historical Archives of EU in Florence
 Archival fonds of CENYC, YFEC and BEC are consultable at the Historical Archives of EU in Florence

International organisations based in Belgium
Organisations based in Brussels
Youth empowerment organizations
Youth organizations based in Europe
Youth rights organizations